Toby Jones is an Australian series of cricket-related novels, written by Michael Panckridge, with help from Australian fast bowler Brett Lee. The series follows the titular character, an up-and-coming young cricketer, who discovers that he has the gift to time-travel to any cricket match ever played in the past, just by looking at the scorecard of the match in a Wisden Cricketer's Almanack. There are five books in the series.

The books
Toby Jones & the Magic Cricket Almanack (2003)
Toby Jones & the Secret of the Missing Scorecard (2004)
Toby Jones & the Mystery of the Time Travel Tour (2005)
Toby Jones & the Timeless Cricket Match (2005)
Toby Jones & the Clash with Father Time (2008)

Omnibus editions
Hat Trick (books 1–3) 
Howzat! (books 4–5)

Characters 

Tobias "Toby" Jones is the titular character, and the main protagonist of the novels. During a visit to the MCC library, he finds Jim Oldfield, an elderly man who introduces him to his gift, being able to time-travel to other cricket matches. Toby is skeptical at first, but upon trying, discovers he truly does have the gift. Only a few members of his cricket team know; Toby has not told his family at all. Toby is also gifted at cricket; primarily a quick bowler, but also as a useful batter, Toby gains vice-captaincy of his school cricket team, and a selection in the Australian Junior World Cup side.

James "Jim" Oldfield is an elderly man, colleague of Toby Jones, and gifted time-traveller. He meets Toby at the MCC library, and tells Toby of his gift. After that, the two form a very close bond, with Jim ending up living with the Jones family. Due to his age, his powers have weakened, and so is unable to repeatedly travel like Toby can. He was appointed as a Cricket Lord in 1950 until 1952, and so is immortal until he is stabbed with his special Cricket Lord stump.

Jay Bromley or Jay Barclay is Toby's best friend. Jay, like Toby, is skeptical of Toby's gift, even more so than Toby, but accepts it when he ends up travelling. He seems resentful towards Toby, as Toby has the gift, is a better cricketer, is closer to all of his friends, and therefore their friendship has dwindled throughout the series. On the cricket field, he appears to be an average batter, and bowls very infrequently.

Georgie is Toby's equal best friend. She lives two doors down from Toby's house, and have been inseparable since they were three. She is the first to know of Toby's gift, but not the first to travel. Like Jay, her relationship with Toby has dwindled slightly, possibly because of Ally's close relationship to Toby. She also seems to like Jim, having met him on several occasions. She is a lower middle order batter, and can bowl medium-pacers with skill.

Ally McCabe is Georgie's best friend. She is the catcher for the state softball team, but gives it up to join the cricket team, as the keeper. She has gotten incredibly close to Toby in the short time that he has known her, leading to Georgie believing that they are a secret item, which they are not. She seems a very accomplished wicketkeeper, and her batting escapades are not shown very often.

Rahul is one of Toby's close friends. A passionate Indian cricket, Rahul is the backup wicketkeeper, and an accomplished top order batsman. He convinces Toby to take him to Madras in an attempt to save his dead brother, but the attempt is a failure.

Scott Craven is Toby's one-time enemy and one-time friend. Touted as the best player in the competition, Scott is a ferocious fast bowler and explosive hitter. He was a part of the Riverwall side, until he swapped to play for his uncle's side, the Scorpions, then swapped back. He, like Toby, also makes it to the Junior World Cup team, and also wins the Best and Fairest in the competition.

Jimbo Temple is the quiet man of the cricket team. A brilliant batter, the best in the team, Jimbo is not allowed to play - a rule imposed by his dad - until Toby manages to turn him around. Jimbo joins Toby in both the MCG cricket camp and the Junior World Cup team.

References

Series of children's books
Novel series by featured character
Novels about cricket
Australian children's novels
Australian fantasy novels
Children's fantasy novels
Novels about time travel
2000s children's books